Pyramid Peak is a peak in the southeast part of Destination Nunataks, Victoria Land, rising to . It was  named by the Northern Party of the New Zealand Federated Mountain Clubs Antarctic Expedition of 1962–63.

References

Mountains of Victoria Land
Pennell Coast